Ronald Rossi   (born December 2, 1956) is an American former luger. He competed in the men's doubles event at the 1984 Winter Olympics.

References

External links
 

1956 births
Living people
American male lugers
Olympic lugers of the United States
Lugers at the 1984 Winter Olympics
Sportspeople from the Bronx